"Workin' at the Car Wash Blues" is a 1974 single written and recorded by Jim Croce. It was the third single released from his album I Got a Name. It reached a peak of #32 in July 1974, on the Billboard Hot 100. It is Croce's last Top 40 hit to date. It was also the fourth single released, including Christmas-themed release "It Doesn't Have To Be That Way", after Jim Croce's death in September 1973.

Content
Jim Croce described this song as having a "funky street feel". During a performance, he explained the song as "a story about a guy who thinks he thinks he should be ruling the universe somewhere, but he is really working at a car wash". Croce explained he came up with the idea for the song while in the military at Fort Jackson, running telephone cables on poles and thinking he should be doing something else. While on top of the pole, he thought about everyone in the same situation thinking they should be doing another "gig" and have a different job.

In the song, a man has just been released from a 90-day prison sentence for "non-support", and believing himself to be "an undiscovered Howard Hughes" and "a genius", tries to smooth-talk his way into an executive position. Every company he tries turns him down, stating they have no openings, which forces him to accept menial work at a car wash. While begrudgingly doing his duties, he fantasizes about the executive life, and imagines himself sitting in an air-conditioned office (as compared to the reality of working "at this indoor Niagara Falls"), smoking cigars, drinking martinis, appearing in high-society magazines, and making sexual remarks at his secretary.

The original title of the song was "I got them steadily depressing, low down, mind messing, working at the car wash blues" (as sung in the song); However, it was shortened before the single's release.

Reception
Cash Box said that "this cute composition...will naturally be another smash for old Croce fans and new" and that "the late singer -songwriter's ability to weave a lyric into his music is quite in evidence here and the result is a totally entertaining experience." Record World said it was Croce's "first local color story-song since 'Leroy Brown'" and described it as a "saga of an undiscovered Howard Hughes."

B-side

The flip side of the single features the song "Thursday".

Live performances
A live version of the song was released on his album Have You Heard: Jim Croce Live which includes an introduction to the song where he explains the origin of it.

Track listing
7" Single (ABC-11447)
 "Workin' At The Car Wash Blues" - 2:30
 "Thursday" - 2:20

Chart performance

Weekly charts

Jim Croce

Tony Booth

Year-end charts

Covers
The song "Workin' at the Car Wash Blues" was covered by American country singer Tony Booth in 1974, the same year as Jim Croce's single. It was also covered by Jerry Reed on his tribute album Jerry Reed Sings Jim Croce.
Gonzo the Great performed the song with some chickens on an episode of The Muppet Show.
The Dutch-Swedish singer-songwriter Cornelis Vreeswijk made in 1976 a dutch version: Autowasserij blues.

References

1974 singles
Jim Croce songs
Songs released posthumously
Songs written by Jim Croce
1973 songs
ABC Records singles
Songs about labor